In mathematics, the ba space  of an algebra of sets  is the Banach space consisting of all bounded and finitely additive signed measures on . The norm is defined as the variation, that is 

If Σ is a sigma-algebra, then the space  is defined as the subset of  consisting of countably additive measures. The notation ba is a mnemonic for bounded additive and ca is short for countably additive.

If X is a topological space, and Σ is the sigma-algebra of Borel sets in X, then  is the subspace of  consisting of all regular Borel measures on X.

Properties 

The ba space of the power set of the natural numbers, ba(2N), is often denoted as simply  and is isomorphic to the dual space of the ℓ∞ space.

Dual of B(Σ) 
Let B(Σ) be the space of bounded Σ-measurable functions, equipped with the uniform norm.  Then ba(Σ) = B(Σ)* is the continuous dual space of B(Σ).  This is due to Hildebrandt and Fichtenholtz & Kantorovich.  This is a kind of Riesz representation theorem which allows for a measure to be represented as a linear functional on measurable functions.  In particular, this isomorphism allows one to define the integral with respect to a finitely additive measure (note that the usual Lebesgue integral requires countable additivity).  This is due to Dunford & Schwartz, and is often used to define the integral with respect to vector measures, and especially vector-valued Radon measures.

The topological duality ba(Σ) = B(Σ)* is easy to see. There is an obvious algebraic duality between the vector space of all finitely additive measures σ on Σ and the vector space of simple functions. It is easy to check that the linear form induced by σ is continuous in the sup-norm if σ is bounded, and the result follows since a linear form on the dense subspace of simple functions extends to an element of B(Σ)* if it is continuous in the sup-norm.

Dual of L∞(μ) 

If Σ is a sigma-algebra and μ is a sigma-additive positive measure on Σ then the Lp space L∞(μ) endowed with the essential supremum norm is by definition the quotient space of B(Σ) by the closed subspace of bounded μ-null functions:

The dual Banach space L∞(μ)* is thus isomorphic to

i.e. the space of finitely additive signed measures on Σ that are absolutely continuous with respect to μ (μ-a.c. for short).

When the measure space is furthermore sigma-finite then L∞(μ) is in turn dual to L1(μ), which by the Radon–Nikodym theorem is identified with the set of all countably additive μ-a.c. measures.
In other words, the inclusion in the bidual

is isomorphic to the inclusion of the space of countably additive μ-a.c. bounded measures inside the space of all finitely additive μ-a.c. bounded measures.

References

Further reading
 
 
 

Measure theory
Banach spaces